Langford is an English surname derived from one of the many places named Langford. Notable people with the surname include the following:

 Albert Langford (1899–1965), English footballer
 Bonnie Langford (born 1964), British actress and entertainer
 Chris Langford (born 1963), Australian rules footballer, father of Will
 Cooper Harold Langford (1895–1964), philosopher and logician
 Darren John Langford (born 1984), actor best known for playing Spencer Gray in Hollyoaks
 David Langford (born 1953), British SF author and publisher of the fanzine Ansible
 Frances Langford (1913–2005), American singer and actress
 Gordon Langford (1930–2017), English composer and arranger
 James Beverly Langford (1922–1996), American lawyer and politician
 Jeremy Langford (born 1991), American football player
 Jon Langford (born 1957), British rock musician and member of The Mekons, brother of David Langford
Josephine Langford (born 1997), Australian actress
 Katherine Langford (born 1996), Australian actress
 Keith Langford (born 1983), American basketball player
 Kendall Langford (born 1986), American football player
 Larry Langford (1946–2019), mayor of Birmingham, Alabama
 Laura Carter Holloway Langford (1843–1930), American journalist, author, and lecturer
 Lisa Kehler (née Langford; born 1967), English race walker
 Lorraine Langford (1923–1998), American politician
 Marty Langford (born 1969), Filmmaker
 Nathaniel P. Langford (1832–1911), first superintendent of the world's first national park, Yellowstone National Park
 Paul Langford (1945–2015), British academic
 Reshard Langford (born 1986), American football player
 Rick Langford (born 1952), Major League Baseball pitcher
 Romeo Langford (born 1999), American basketball player
 Sam Langford (1886–1956), Canadian professional boxer
 Terry Langford (1966–1998), American convicted murderer
 Tommy Langford (born 1989), British professional boxer
 Will Langford (born 1992), Australian rules footballer, son of Chris

See also 
 Baron Langford
 Langford baronets
 Lankford (surname)
 Viscount Langford

English-language surnames